The 2008 Miami Hurricanes football team  represented the University of Miami during the 2008 NCAA Division I FBS football season. It was the Hurricanes' 83rd season of football and 5th as a member of the Atlantic Coast Conference. The Hurricanes were led by second-year head coach Randy Shannon and played their home games at Dolphin Stadium. They finished the season 7–6 overall and 4–4 in the ACC to finish in a tie for third place in the Coastal Division. They were invited to the Emerald Bowl where they lost to California, 24-17.

Before the season

Roster changes
University of Miami safety Kenny Phillips and defensive end Calais Campbell made the decision to forgo their senior years and declare for the NFL Draft. Phillips was drafted in the first round, No. 31 overall by the New York Giants. Campbell was drafted in the second round, No. 50 overall to the Arizona Cardinals. Linebacker Tavaris Gooden was also drafted in the third round, No. 79 overall to the Baltimore Ravens.  Senior quarterback Kirby Freeman, who split time with now undrafted free-agent Kyle Wright in 2007, was informed by the University of Miami coaching staff that he would begin the year third on the depth chart, behind redshirt freshman Robert Marve and true freshman Jacory Harris.  Shocked at this news, Freeman decided to transfer, going back to his native Texas at Baylor University.
Freshman Doug Wiggins, rated the nation's thirty-third best player coming out of high school by Rivals.com, transferred to Western Michigan.  The reasons for the move were unclear but reports eventually surfaced that Wiggins had had trouble adjusting to his backup role.
Freshman Chris Perry transferred to Texas Tech University after redshirting his freshman year at UM.
Junior DajLeon Farr, previously a top tight end recruit out of high school, transferred to the University of Memphis. Daren Daly, a former walk-on kicker who previously attended Florida State University, also decided to transfer and faced his former Hurricanes team as a member of the UCF Golden Knights.
Other transfers included George Robinson, George Timmons, Jerrell Mabry, Charlie Jones, Demetri Stewart, and Luqman Abdallah. Junior defensive end Courtney Harris suffered an Achilles injury and was out for the season.

Recruiting class of 2008

Schedule

Game summaries

Charleston Southern

The game was the first time the Hurricanes played Charleston Southern. It was also the first home game for the Hurricanes in Dolphin Stadium with an attendance of 48,119.

Florida

The Hurricanes had not lost to the Gators since 1985, owning six consecutive victories in the series. Overall, the Hurricanes leads the series 28–26. The game was the third-most watched game in ESPN history.

Texas A&M

This game was played on September 20, 2008 at College Station, Texas, before a Kyle Field crowd of 84,165.  The two schools had been against each other twice before: the Aggies won 70–14 in 1944, with Miami winning 34–17 in 2007.

For the Hurricanes, Robert Marve completed 16 of his 22 passes, for a total of 212 yards; he threw two touchdown passes, and suffered one interception.  Graig Cooper ran for a career-best 128 yards and scored two touchdowns as the Hurricanes compiled 398 yards of offense for the game.  The 18-point margin was Texas A&M's worst in a non-conference home contest since losing 30–10 to Alabama in 1988.

North Carolina

The two schools played for the fifth straight year, and the Tar Heels owned a 6–5 lead in the series heading into the game. UNC now leads the series 7–5.

Florida State

The Hurricanes and Seminoles will meet for the 53rd time, last season, the Hurricanes defeated FSU 37–29 in Tallahassee and now holds a 30–22 lead in the series. The only time the two schools have met at Dolphin Stadium, UM won 16–14 in the 2004 Orange Bowl Classic.

UCF

This game, played on October 11, 2008 in Miami, was the first between the two schools, with Central Florida having joined Division I-A in 1996.  For the Hurricanes, Graig Cooper ran for 90 yards and the game-winning touchdown on a career-high 23 attempts.  The Hurricanes forced the Knights into punting 12 times, and limited their offense to a total of 78 yards (74 yards gained via the pass, and 4 yards on the ground).  Despite the Hurricanes' defensive effort, the game remained close as UCF scored on an interception return of 62 yards, and on a 91-yard kickoff return.

Duke

Miami had a 4–1 lead in the series and had won three straight games since joining the ACC and four in a row altogether.

Wake Forest

The only times the two teams have played in ACC action, the Hurricanes won both games by a combined score of 99–24, and UM held a 5–3 lead in the series.

Virginia

This was the sixth game between the two schools, and the fifth straight year the two schools had met.

Virginia Tech

Despite losing the last two games to VT, the Hurricanes still held a 16–9 lead in the series. Frank Beamer's Hokies were 11–3 the previous year and were the ACC champions. They lost the Orange Bowl to Kansas, where new Hurricanes defensive coordinator Bill Young held that position for the Jayhawks.

Georgia Tech

Georgia Tech's triple option offense ran for 472 yards against the Hurricanes. The Jackets scored three second-quarter touchdowns and reached a 24–3 halftime lead. After that, the Hurricanes got no closer than 27–10 as Georgia Tech were successful. Late in the game, Georgia Tech ran the ball half-heartedly on 4th down to avoid scoring and avoid insulting the Hurricanes by either kneeling, kicking a field goal, or scoring a touchdown. The score was 41–10 at one point.

North Carolina State

North Carolina State won 38–28.

Emerald Bowl

The Hurricanes accepted an invitation to the 2008 Emerald Bowl in San Francisco to face California in what was essentially a home game for the Bears. Freshman quarterback Jacory Harris started at quarterback after Marve was suspended for academic reasons. Four other players were suspended for violating team rules and not allowed on the trip.

The Bears reached an early 14–0 lead, but Harris was able to lead the Hurricanes back with touchdown passes in the second and third quarter while the Hurricanes' defense was able to shut out the Cal offense in the second quarter and limited them to a field goal in the third. The go ahead score came late in the fourth quarter when Bears linebacker Zack Follett forced a fumble in the backfield by Harris that the Bears recovered and were able to convert into a touchdown. The game marked the third consecutive loss for the Hurricanes, while the bowl win was the end of Cal's season with three wins in a row.

Rankings

Statistics

Team

Scores by quarter

Offense

Rushing

Passing

Receiving

Defense

Special teams

Coaching staff

References

Miami
Miami Hurricanes football seasons
Miami Hurricanes football